The Prasada is a luxury apartment house at 50 Central Park West on the Upper West Side of Manhattan in New York City. Built between 1904 and 1907, it is a contributing building in the Central Park West Historic District. It cost $250,000 (the equivalent of more than $7 million in 2022). Originally, it contained three luxury apartments per floor: an eight-room apartment at the rear and two ten-room apartments facing Central Park in the front. Servants' bedrooms, bathrooms, kitchens, and other rooms were located facing the court. The building surrounds an open court, with stained-glass skylights illuminating the lobby.

The structure is a bold essay in the French Second Empire style and was one of three that established Central Park West as an avenue of tall apartment blocks, in this case of twelve storeys.

Extensive alterations in 1919 removed the mansard roof that was a prominent feature when viewed from the park and provided more modern facilities.

Residents and guests enter through an impressive recessed portico supported by four two-story banded pillars styled as Roman Doric columns. A dry moat separates the ground floor from pedestrian passers-by.

The building was featured in the following films:
Three Men and a Baby
Lord of War

References

Apartment buildings in New York City
Central Park West Historic District
Condominiums and housing cooperatives in Manhattan
Historic district contributing properties in Manhattan
Residential buildings completed in 1907
Residential buildings in Manhattan
Residential buildings on the National Register of Historic Places in Manhattan
Upper West Side